Joseph Mydell (born 1955) is a screen and stage actor, writer and public speaker.

Early life
Joseph Mydell was born 1955 in Savannah, Georgia. He attended West Savannah elementary school; Tompkins High School (class of 1963); Morehouse College (1964-65), where he met Martin Luther King, when King spoke at his alma mater after receiving the Nobel Prize for Peace. Inspired by King, and the call of Bahá'ís to participated in the (probably third) Selma to Montgomery marches in 1965. 

Mydell then continued his education at the New York University, School of the Arts(B.F.A., 1970; M.F.A., 1974) City University of New York (CUNY Ph. D Theatre studies, 1976-1979).

Career
Mydell got his training as a student actor, working with Dr. Baldwin Burroughs and the Atlanta Morehouse Spelman Players in Shakespeare”s The Tempest, and Trials of Brother Jero by Wole Soyinka. In 1969 Mydell co-performed a play Who is America at the US Bahá'í national convention, the first "Youth for the World" conference in Nashville, Tennessee, then at another one in Dayton, Ohio, that summer, and later in November at the University Park campus of the Pennsylvania State University. At NYU, he was trained by Lloyd Richards, Olympia Dukakis, Kristin Linklater, and directed by Andre Gregory. His professional career began in New York with the New York Shakespeare Festival and Lincoln Center theatre.  He got his Equity card understudying Clevon Little off- Broadway. He also worked at Seattle Repertory theatre and for the National Endowment for the Arts in their touring production, “For All Times”.

Mydell came to England in 1979 doing research for his one-man show on Paul Laurence Dunbar, Lyrics of the Hearthside, which he developed while studying for a Ph.D in theatre.

In 1980 he won a Fringe First and Best One-man show award at the Edinburgh Festival. The United States Information Service sponsored an African tour of his show. He later began work with Royal Shakespeare Company, and has continued his association with this company for over thirty years. He has also worked extensively at The Royal National theatre.

Filmography

Film

Television

Stage

External links
Full CV on Agent's website
IMDB listing

References

American male actors
1955 births
Living people
Actors from Savannah, Georgia
Tisch School of the Arts alumni